The concept of ,  or , literally "cleanliness of blood" and meaning "blood purity", was an early system of racialized discrimination used in early modern Spain and Portugal.

The label referred to those who were considered "Old Christians", without recent ancestry from people who had not been Christian, such as Muslim or Jewish ancestors. In the context of the Spanish Empire, the concept defined castes of those of Spanish or Portuguese ancestry, as opposed to the non-Christian aboriginal populations of Asia, Africa and the Americas.

After the Reconquista 
By the end of the Reconquista and the conversion or expulsion of Muslim mudéjars and Sephardi Jews, the populations of Portugal and Spain were all nominally Christian. Spain's population of 7 million included up to a million recent converts from Islam and 200,000 converts from Judaism, who were collectively referred to as "New Christians". Converts from Judaism were referred to as conversos and converts from Islam were known as Moriscos. A commonly leveled accusation was that the New Christians were false converts, secretly practicing their former religion as Crypto-Jews or Crypto-Muslims. The concept of purity of blood came to be focused more on ancestry than on personal religion.

The Limpieza de Sangre statutes 
The first statute of purity of blood was enacted in Toledo, Spain, 1449, where an anti-converso riot succeeded in gaining a ban on conversos and their descendants from most official positions. Initially, these statutes were condemned by the monarchy and the Church; however, in 1496, Pope Alexander VI approved a purity statute for the Hieronymites.

This stratification meant that the Old Christian commoners might assert a right to honor even if they were not in the nobility. The religious and military orders, guilds and other organizations incorporated in their by-laws clauses demanding proof of cleanliness of blood. Upwardly mobile New Christian families had to either contend with discrimination, or bribe officials and falsify documents attesting generations of Christian ancestry.

The claim to universal hidalguía (lowest nobility) of the Basques was justified by intellectuals such as Manuel Larramendi (1690–1766). Because the Umayyad conquest of Hispania had not reached the Basque territories, it was believed that Basques had maintained their original purity, while the rest of Spain was suspect of miscegenation. The universal hidalguía of Basques helped many of them to positions of power in the administration. This idea was reinforced by the fact that, as a result of the Reconquista, numerous Spanish noble lineages were already of Basque origin.

By the sixteenth century, the limpieza de sangre statutes coalesced to become a systematic effort to exclude conversos from offices in Church and state, rapidly multiplying due to being strongly supported by cathedral chapters and the colegios mayores (senior colleges), a type of fraternity which included scholarships, tutorial services, and in some cases even chairs within the university structure. This hyper-focus on the purity of blood from any level of power promoted the elite and exclusive nature of them, which were also imbued in and promoted by the letrado bureaucracy, professional civil servants usually with degrees in law as well as churchmen formed a large majority of the Spanish civil service in the sixteenth century. Which was then passed down from generation to generation of graduates from these universities, continuing to pervade the civic mind with an anti-converso mindset.

One example found is the romantic engagement between Pedro Francisco Molines and Maria Aguiló as in a legal brief on behalf of Pedro arguing why they cannot, should not, and will not, marry Maria. It is determined that Maria is not of "pure blood" and because of this, Pedro has no legal obligation to marry her and also can be prevented from doing so as not to dirty his clean blood: "…being that the aforementioned Aguiló has proven to be the descendant of Jews, and these being disgraced, by said infamy, even if they had been engaged, said Molines should not marry her; because he is of clean blood…" This insistence of the purity of blood not only squelched many familial lines that were established over centuries, but also prevented many upward-moving Spaniards of "dirty lineage" from establishing themselves and their families in the socio-economic system of the times. Alienating them to the sidelines due to a perceived impurity and cultivating a connection between race and impurity, which would soon consolidate these values into forms of racism based on race that were only beginning to form at this time. The last page of the brief also notes that the judge has the right to even imprison Pedro until he finds a more suitable woman of "pure blood" to marry, which is the proceeded by 15 men agreeing with the clauses and arguments found in the brief. Many of the signatories are either friars or scholars of canon law, which demonstrates the staunch religious support the limpieza de sangre statutes found.

These statutes were seen as the touchstones of the inquisition’s existence, promoting a system that bred fear and encouraged hostile witness and even perjury that twinned with the fear of finding an ancestor with Jewish blood; resulting in a person's entire familial line losing everything as a result.

The limpieza de sangre statutes were not without their dissenters however, as it challenged the social status of every stratification of the population. This ranged from: conversos and moriscos, the aristocracy who stood to lose standing because of documented Jewish ancestry and the agricultural workers who farmed their lands, all the way to some Catholic reformers who saw it as a challenge to the efficacy of baptism and a perversion of Christ’s Millennialism. It became clear that while many of these statutes passed throughout the highest echelons of power, the entirety of the Spanish population was not in favor of these laws of blood segregation.

Testing and eventual decline 
Tests of limpieza de sangre had begun to lose their utility by the 19th century; rarely did persons have to endure the grueling inquisitions into distant parentage through birth records. However, laws requiring limpieza de sangre were still sometimes adopted even into the 19th century. For example, an edict of 8 March 1804 by King Ferdinand VII resolved that no knight of the military orders might wed without having a council vouch for the limpieza de sangre of his spouse.

Official suppression of such entry requirements for the Army was enacted into law on 16 May 1865, and extended to naval appointments on 31 August of the same year. On 5 November 1865, a decree allowed children born out of wedlock, for whom ancestry could not be verified, to be able to enter into religious higher education (canons). On 26 October 1866, the test of blood purity was outlawed for the purposes of determining who might be admitted to college education. On 20 March 1870, a decree suppressed all use of blood purity standards in determining eligibility for any government position or any licensed profession.

The discrimination was still present into the 20th century in some places such as Majorca. No Xueta (descendants of the Majorcan conversos) priests were allowed to say Mass in a cathedral until the 1960s.

Procedure to judge purity of blood 
The earliest known case judging limpieza de sangre comes from the Church of Cordoba, that explained the procedure to judge the purity of blood of candidates as follows: kneeling, with right hand placed over the image of a crucifix on a Bible, the candidates confirmed themselves as being of neither Jewish or Moorish extraction. Then the candidate provided the names and birthplaces of their parents and grandparents. Two delegates of the council, church or other public place would then research the information to make sure it was truthful. If the investigation had to be undertaken outside Cordoba, a person, not necessarily a member of the council, would be appointed to examine the witnesses chosen by the candidate. This researcher would receive a sum per diem according to the that person's rank, the distance traveled and time spent. Having collected all the reports, the secretary or the notary had to read them all to the council, and a simple majority vote would decide whether the candidate was approved; after approval the candidate had to promise to obey all the laws and customs of the Church.

Spanish colonies

The concept of limpieza de sangre was a significant barrier for many Spaniards to emigrate to the Americas, since some form of proof of not having recent Muslim or Jewish ancestors was required to emigrate to the Spanish Empire. However, within Spain's overseas territories the concept evolved to be linked with racial purity for both Spaniards and indigenous. Proofs of racial purity were required in a variety of circumstances in both Spain and its overseas territories. Candidates for office and their spouses had to obtain a certificate of purity that proved that they had no Jewish or Muslim ancestors and in New Spain, proof of whiteness and absence of any in the lineage who had engaged in work with their hands.

Additionally, as early as the sixteenth century, shortly after the Spanish colonization of the Americas was initiated, several regulations were enacted in the Laws of the Indies to prevent Jews and Muslims and their descendants from emigrating to and settling in the overseas colonies. There was a thriving business in creating false documentation to allow conversos to emigrate to Spain's overseas territories. The provisions banning emigration were repeatedly stressed in later editions of the Laws, which provides an indication that the regulations were often ignored, most likely because colonial authorities at the time looked the other way as the skills of those immigrants were badly needed. During the period when Portugal and Spain were ruled by the same monarch (15801640), Portuguese merchants, many of whom were crypto-Jews, passing as Christians, became important members of the merchant communities in the viceregal capitals of Mexico City and Lima. When Portugal successfully revolted in 1640 from Spain, the Holy Office of the Inquisition in both capitals initiated intensive investigations to identify and prosecute crypto-Jews, resulting in spectacular autos-da-fé in the mid-seventeenth century.

Society of Jesus
Ignatius of Loyola, the founder of the Society of Jesus (Jesuits), said that "he would take it as a special grace from our Lord to come from Jewish lineage". In the first 30 years of the Society of Jesus, many Jesuits were conversos. However, an anti-converso faction led to the Decree de genere (1593), which proclaimed that either Jewish or Muslim ancestry, no matter how distant, was an insurmountable impediment for admission to the Society of Jesus - effectively applying the Spanish principle of Limpieza de sangre to Jesuits Europe-wide and world-wide. 

Aleksander Maryks interprets the 1593 decree as preventing, despite Ignatius's desires, any Jewish or Muslim conversos and, by extension, any person with Jewish or Muslim ancestry, no matter how distant, from admission to the Society of Jesus. Jesuit scholar John Padberg states that the restriction on Jewish/Muslim converts was limited only to the degree of parentage. Fourteen years later this was extended back to the fifth degree. This 16th-century Decree de genere remained in force far longer among the Jesuits than in the Spanish state, though over time the restriction relating to Muslim ancestry was dropped leaving only people of Jewish ancestry to be excluded. In 1923, the 27th Jesuit General Congregation reiterated that "The impediment of origin extends to all who are descended from the Jewish race, unless it is clear that their father, grandfather, and great grandfather have belonged to the Catholic Church." Only in 1946, in the aftermath of the Second World War, did the 29th General Congregation drop the requirement, but it still called for "cautions to be exercised before admitting a candidate about whom there is some doubt as to the character of his hereditary background".

See also
 Blue blood
 Cagot
 Casta
 Caste
 Converso
 Morisco
 Crypto-Judaism
 Inquisition
 Judaizer
 Marrano
 One-drop rule
Malinchism

References

Further reading

Alberro, Solange. Inquisición y sociedad en México, 1571-1700. Mexico City: Fondo de Cultura Económica 1993.
Beinart, Haim. Conversos ante la inquisición. Jerusalem: Hebrew University 1965.
Gitlitz, David. Secrecy and Deceit: The Religion of the Crypto-Jews, Albuquerque, NM: University of New Mexico Press, 2002. 
Gojman de Backal, Alicia. "Conversos" in Encyclopedia of Mexico. Chicago: Fitzroy Dearborn 1997, vol. 1, pp. 340–344.
Gojman Goldberg, Alicia. Los conversos en la Nueva España. Mexico City: Enep-Acatlan, UNAM 1984.
Greenleaf, Richard E. The Mexican Inquisition in the Sixteenth Century. Albuquerque: University of New Mexico Press 1969.
Hering Torres, Max S., et al., eds. Race and Blood in the Iberian World. Berlin: Lit, 2012.

Lafaye, Jacques. Cruzadas y Utopias: El judeocristianismo en las sociedades Ibéricas. Mexico City: Fondo de Cultura Económica 1984.
Lanning, John Tate. "Legitimacy and Limpieza de Sangre in the Practice of Medicine in the Spanish Empire." Jahrbuch für Geschicte 4 (1967)
Liebman, Seymour. Los Judíos en México y en América Central. Mexico city: Siglo XXI 1971.
Martínez, Maria Elena. "Limpieza de Sangre" in Encyclopedia of Mexico, vol. 1, pp. 749-752. chicago: Fitzroy Dearborn 1997.
Roth, Norman, Conversos, Inquisition, and the Expulsion of the Jews from Spain, Madison, WI: University of Wisconsin Press, 1995. 
Seed, Patricia. To Love, Honor, and Obey in Colonial Mexico: Conflicts over Marriage Choices, 1574-1821. Stanford: Stanford University Press 1988.
Sicroff, Albert A. Los estatutos de limpieza de sangre. Translated by Mauro Armiño. Madrid: Tauros 1985.

External links
 Attestment of the purity of blood of Justo Rufino de San Martín (brother of José) in Paredes de Nava, 1794. Note - Google translation from Spanish to English.
 Douglass, William A. (2004) Sabino's sin: racism and the founding of Basque nationalism in Daniele Conversi (ed.), Ethnonationalism in the Contemporary World''. London: Routledge, pp. 95–112.

Basque history
Jewish Mexican history
Jewish Portuguese history
Jewish Spanish history
Portuguese Inquisition
Racism in Spain
Spanish Inquisition
Moriscos
History of the conversos
Racial antisemitism
Latin American caste system